Anthony Marciona  (born September 27, 1961) is an American film, Broadway and television actor, singer and dancer from New York City. Marciona began his acting career at the age of five playing Kirk Douglas' godson in The Brotherhood.

Biography
Marciona was born in The Bronx, New York to parents Joseph Marciona, a retired NYC teacher, and Louise (née Smedile). He and his family moved to Pelham in Westchester County, where he graduated from Pelham Memorial High School. After graduating he moved back to New York City.

He currently resides in Los Angeles with his business and life partner, Joseph A. LoBue. He has one sister, Suzan Marciona, and two nieces, Francesca Louise and Simone Marie.

He helped create That's A Nice!  a gourmet Southern-Italian specialty food line which
produces all-natural gourmet products from original family Sicilian recipes at www.thatsanice.com

Education
Marciona studied film making at the School of Visual Arts in New York, University of California Los Angeles, and also received a business degree from SMC. He was also a composition/jazz major at the Manhattan School of Music. Marciona studied drama at the Royal Academy of Dramatic Arts in London, American Academy of Dramatic Arts, HB Studios, The Groundlings, BANG. He has also been coached under Sanford Meisner, Diane Castle, Bill Esper, and John Kirby.

Career

Acting
Since his career began in 1966, Marciona has worked with a greatly diverse group of successful actor/actresses, producers, singers, dancers and composers including Angela Lansbury, John Guare, Chuck Norris, Dustin Hoffman, Harold Prince, Marisa Tomei, Stephen Schwartz, Jason Mraz, Pete Townshend, Jerome Robbins, F. Murray Abraham, Andrew Lloyd Webber, Herschel Bernardi, Alberto Sordi, Arthur Laurents, Jennifer Lopez and The B-52s.

Aside from acting, Marciona has become active behind the scenes as well. In 1990 he founded and is director of ETC inc. a Non-profit organization which presents New American Theatre in Rome, Italy and Los Angeles. He produced four short film projects which have won awards on PBS and the festival circuit under his production company D.I.Y.N. Productions which he co-established with Raymond Carver Award-winning writer/director Joyceann Masters.

Marciona has also been a commercial casting session director having worked for McDonald's, Pepsi, United Airlines and many other company's.

He created and ran a multi-media arts complex called The Space, in Hollywood, California consisting of multiple casting studios, 2 performing arts theaters, rehearsal facilities, and production offices.

Music and dance
As a musical composer Marciona has completed the scores to the stage musicals Murder At The Palace and Powder Puff Derby. He is also composer in development with A.N.M.T. Marciona plays the piano and has written for and performed with two pop music bands Interpret and Ariel & Anthony.

He studied dance under the legendary teacher and choreographer Phil Black, in New York.

Filmography

Television appearances

References

External links
 
 Biography on Official Website

1961 births
American male dancers
American male film actors
American male musical theatre actors
American male television actors
Living people
People from Pelham, New York